The Old Catholic Mission in France represents those Christians in France tied to the Utrecht Union of the Old Catholic Churches through the Christian Catholic Church of Switzerland.

Christian denominations founded in France
Old Catholicism by country
Catholicism in France